In mathematical logic, various sublanguages of set theory are decidable.  These include:
 Sets with  Monotone, Additive, and Multiplicative Functions.
 Sets with restricted quantifiers.

References

Proof theory
Logic in computer science
Model theory